Ieva Zasimauskaitė (born 2 July 1993) is a Lithuanian singer who represented Lithuania in the Eurovision Song Contest 2018 with her song "When We're Old". She had previously participated in the Lithuanian national selection for the Eurovision in 2013, 2014, 2016, and 2017, and participated again in 2022.

Biography
Ieva Zasimauskaitė was born and raised in Kaunas, the second largest city of Lithuania. In 2012, she graduated from Kaunas Vytautas Magnus University Rasos Gymnasium in Kalniečiai. In 2015, she received Bachelor's degree in Hotel Management from the International School of Law and Business (TTVAM) in the Lithuanian capital Vilnius. In 2014, Ieva spent a semester following the Erasmus Programme in Barcelona, Spain. In the spring of 2015 she completed an internship in a hotel in her hometown Kaunas and for some time worked in a gift shop.

At the age of seven, Ieva was sent to the vocal class of the Kaunas Music School where she studied for eight years. At the music school, Ieva sang in the Children's vocal band "Linksmasis do" and played the piano. During this time, she also participated in various competitions and festivals. In 2007 she went to the Junior Eurovision Song Contest 2007 as a backing vocalist for Lina Jurevičiūtė. When she was 16 years old, she became a member of the Kaunas Choir on the TV3 project "Chorų karai" (Clash of the Choirs). After the choir won the TV project, Ieva performed for three years together with the choir throughout Lithuania (giving up to 16 concerts per month). Afterwards, she began to work personally with the composer and music producer Tautkus, leader of the Boy band N.E.O. At that time she met her future husband, who was a member of the band.

In 2012 Ieva participated in the project Lietuvos balsas ("The Voice of Lithuania"). She managed to reach the superfinal and sang together with Dima Bilan his hit song "Never Let You Go". Shortly thereafter she began her solo career and composed her first song "Pasiilgau" ('I miss'). Then she had many concerts with her band. Mostly she sang at corporate events and weddings, performing songs by Adele, Rihanna and Alicia Keys.

Ieva learned vocals from rock singer Česlovas Gabalis, opera singer Kristina Zmailaitė, Rosita Čivilytė and Gendrius Jokūbėnas.

Ieva is also a songwriter and sings self-composed songs.

Personal life
Ieva's parents are medical employees. Her father plays guitar. Ieva has an older brother Ugnius (born 1989).

Ieva was married in June 2015 after a relationship of five years in a Catholic Archangel Michael Church of Kaunas. Her husband Marius Kiltinavičius (born 1982) is a former coach of the Lithuanian National Basketball Team (U-20), former coach of BC Sūduva-Mantinga and also a former singer of the Boyband N.E.O.  In 2014 they both became vegetarians. They are interested in Ayurveda and practice meditation. They have travelled together as pilgrims to India several times. Ieva is a follower of the Hare Krishna movement, a Hindu religious organisation. The couple divorced in 2020.

Discography

Singles

References

External links

21st-century Lithuanian women singers
Eurovision Song Contest entrants for Lithuania
Eurovision Song Contest entrants of 2018
Living people
Musicians from Kaunas
1993 births
Lithuanian Hindus
Lithuanian pop singers
Converts to Hinduism from Catholicism
Hare Krishnas